Ann Mari Falk (December 19, 1916 – July 27, 1988) was a Swedish writer and translator.

Her brother  was also a writer. She worked for the insurance company Hansa from 1935 to 1951. Falk published her first novel Fruntimmer in 1944. She later translated children's literature from Danish and Norwegian into Swedish.

Falk won a competition sponsored by publisher Wahlström & Widstrand in 1950.

She was married twice: first to Jan Falk, a journalist, in 1935 and then to the writer  in 1948. Falk and Eng had a son.

Falk died at the age of 71.

Selected works 
 Mord i dockskåp graphic novel (1961)
 Madame är död graphic novel (1964)
 Dialog youth literature (1968)
 Måns i Vasastan children's book (1969)
 Min bror Fredrik youth literature (1977)
 Räkna med bråk youth literature (1978)
 När Anton talade sanning children's book (1982)

References

Further reading  
 

1916 births
1988 deaths
Swedish women writers
Swedish translators
20th-century translators